The 1971 West Virginia Mountaineers football team represented West Virginia University in the 1971 NCAA University Division football season. It was the Mountaineers' 79th overall season and they competed as an independent. The team was led by head coach Bobby Bowden, in his second year, and played their home games at Mountaineer Field in Morgantown, West Virginia. They finished the season with a record of 7–4.

Schedule

Game summaries

Pittsburgh

Source: Palm Beach Post

References

West Virginia
West Virginia Mountaineers football seasons
West Virginia Mountaineers football